The twenty-first season of The Bachelor premiered on January 2, 2017. This season features 36-year-old Nick Viall, a software sales executive from Waukesha, Wisconsin.

Viall attended the University of Wisconsin–Milwaukee where he graduated with a bachelor's degree in business administration. Viall was the runner-up on both the 10th and 11th seasons of The Bachelorette featuring Andi Dorfman and Kaitlyn Bristowe, respectively. He also made it to the final episode on the 3rd season of Bachelor in Paradise along with Bachelor alumna Jennifer Saviano.

The season concluded on March 13, 2017, with Viall choosing to propose to 29-year-old special education teacher Vanessa Grimaldi. They ended their engagement on August 25, 2017.

Production

Casting and contestants
On August 30, 2016, during season 2 episode 4 of Bachelor in Paradise: After Paradise and while the 3rd season of Bachelor in Paradise was still airing, Nick Viall was announced as the next Bachelor. Prior to Viall's selection in the series, fan favorites Luke Pell and Chase McNary, both from The Bachelorette season 12 were considered for the lead role on the show, according to host Chris Harrison. Pell and McNary would go on to compete in The Bachelor Winter Games and season six of Bachelor in Paradise, respectively.

Filming and development
Filming of this season began on September 24, 2016, as it was traveled to many places including Viall's home state of Wisconsin; New Orleans, Louisiana; Saint Thomas in United States Virgin Islands; Bimini, the Bahamas and Finnish Lapland. Numerous media outlets reported Backstreet Boys have performed at Honda Stage at the iHeartRadio Theater in Downtown Los Angeles on September 30, 2016. Besides Backstreet Boys, this season also had appearances include Olympians Michelle Carter, Allyson Felix and Carl Lewis, country singer Chris Lane and Lolo.

The production was initially set to travel to Charleston, South Carolina from Los Angeles, host Chris Harrison stated that it would be headed to Kiawah Island, but was changed to Viall's home state of Wisconsin due to Hurricane Matthew hit South Carolina, although the state would later be visited in the thirteenth season of The Bachelorette.

Contestants

The season began with 30 contestants.

Future appearances

The Bachelorette
Rachel Lindsay was chosen as the bachelorette for the thirteenth season of The Bachelorette while this season of the show was still airing, becoming the first African American lead cast member of the franchise's history, while Raven Gates, Alexis Waters, Kristina Schulman, Astrid Loch, Whitney Fransway, Jasmine Goode and Corinne Olympios made several appearances as well.

Bachelor in Paradise
Season 4

Raven Gates, Corinne Olympios, Taylor Nolan, Alexis Waters, Lacey Mark, Kristina Schulman, Danielle Maltby, Danielle Lombard, Christen Whitney, Sarah Vendal, Dominique Alexis, Jaimi King, and Jasmine Goode, returned for season 4 of Bachelor in Paradise. Olympios quit in week 1 after the production shutdown. Mark had originally quit during week 1 but returned following the shutdown. Maltby quit in week 2, and Schulman in week 3. Waters and Vendal were eliminated in week 2, and King in week 4. In week 4, Lombard split from Dean Unglert, Whitney split from Jack Stone, Alexis split from Diggy Moreland, and Goode split from Jonathan Treece. Gates, Nolan, and Mark all left Paradise in relationships with Adam Gottschalk, Derek Peth, and Daniel Maguire, respectively. It was announced on the reunion show, however, that Mark and Maguire had ended their relationship. Gottschalk and Gates were still together, while Peth and Nolan became engaged. 

Season 5

Whitney, Astrid Loch and Angela Amezcua returned for season 5 of Bachelor in Paradise. Amezcua and Whitney were eliminated in week 4. Loch split Kevin Wendt in week six. It was announced on the reunion show, however, that they had rekindled their relationship after leaving Paradise. 

Season 6

Amezcua and Schulman returned for season 6 of Bachelor in Paradise, along with Whitney Fransway. Schulman and Fransway quit in week 5. Amezcua split from Chase McNary in week 6.

Season 8

Maltby returned for season 8 of Bachelor in Paradise. She left in a relationship with Michael Allio in week 6. 

Bachelor in Paradise Canada

Amezcua returned for the inaugural season of Bachelor in Paradise Canada. She left in a relationship with her partner Brendan Morgan.

Dancing with the Stars
Viall competed in the 24th season of Dancing with the Stars. He partnered with Peta Murgatroyd and finished in 6th place.

Ex On The Beach

Outside of the Bachelor Nation franchise, Goode was featured on the first season of the USA version of Ex On The Beach.

Call-out order

 The contestant received the first impression rose
 The contestant received a rose during the date
 The contestant was eliminated
 The contestant was eliminated during the date
 The contestant was eliminated outside the rose ceremony
 The contestant moved on to the next week by default
 The contestant won the competition

Episodes

Post-show
Nick and Vanessa announced their breakup on August 25, 2017.

Vanessa married Josh Wolfe on August 20, 2021. Vanessa and Josh have one son together, Winston Franco (born September 29, 2022).

Notes

References

External links
 

2017 American television seasons
The Bachelor (American TV series) seasons
Television shows filmed in California
Television shows filmed in Wisconsin
Television shows filmed in New Orleans
Television shows filmed in the United States Virgin Islands
Television shows filmed in the Bahamas
Television shows filmed in Arkansas
Television shows filmed in Texas
Television shows filmed in Miami
Television shows filmed in Montreal
Television shows filmed in New York City
Television shows filmed in Finland